The World Group was the highest level of Davis Cup competition in 2006. The first-round losers went into the Davis Cup World Group Play-offs, and the winners progress to the quarterfinals. The quarterfinalists were guaranteed a World Group spot for 2007.

Participating Teams

Draw

First round

Austria vs. Croatia

Argentina vs. Sweden

Belarus vs. Spain

Switzerland vs. Australia

Germany vs. France

Netherlands vs. Russia

United States vs. Romania

Chile vs. Slovakia

Quarterfinals

Croatia vs. Argentina

Australia vs. Belarus

France vs. Russia

United States vs. Chile

Semifinals

Argentina vs. Australia

Russia vs. United States

Final

Russia vs. Argentina

References

World Group
Davis Cup World Group